Josh Gilbert (born March 17, 1981) is an American bassist, vocalist, songwriter and producer, who performs primarily metalcore. He has played with several acts, including As I Lay Dying and Wovenwar. He is also a contributor to Alternative Press. He currently plays bass as a touring member of Spiritbox.

Career

Gilbert's musical career began with his first band Mothra in Birmingham, Alabama. Shortly after, they changed their name to This Endearing, and sent a demo to Tim Lambesis, frontman of As I Lay Dying. This Endearing disbanded in 2006 and Gilbert went on to join As I Lay Dying. Gilbert was As I Lay Dying's bassist from 2006 until 2014, when Lambesis was arrested. Before Lambesis' arrest, Gilbert performed in two of Lambesis' side-projects, Austrian Death Machine and Pyrithion. For the Pyrithion EP, Gilbert contributed bass as a session musician as well as JP Andrade on drums, with the official members being, Lambesis, Ryan Glissen (formerly of Allegaeon), and Andrew Godwin (formerly of Embodyment and The Famine).  With Austrian Death Machine, Gilbert performed vocals on the two albums, Total Brutal and Double Brutal, and performed bass for the live band.

After Lambesis' arrest, the remaining members of AILD, guitarists Nick Hipa and Phil Sgrosso, and drummer Jordan Mancino formed Wovenwar. It was assumed that Gilbert was originally the vocalist, though it was later discovered that though he was, the primary vocalist was Shane Blay. After AILD went on hiatus, the band was approached by Brian Slagel, Metal Blade Records owner. The band has released two albums, Wovenwar (2014) and Honor Is Dead (2016).

Gilbert also performed in a project called Year One, together with Lee Turner, former bandmate and former drummer of Maylene and the Sons of Disaster, All In and This Endearing members Clayton Graves, Joseph McQueen, as well as Marko Gorupic of Legion and My Reply. In addition to touring full time with As I Lay Dying, he also co-owns and operates recording studio Sparrow Sound with his business partner Joseph McQueen out of Los Angeles.

Josh has also written/co-written for the likes of Bullet for My Valentine – "Venom" and "Skin" (2015), Light the Torch – Revival (2018) and Stitched Up Heart.

It was announced that Josh would be filling in, in Bill Crook's place, for Spiritbox for their 2022 shows.

Bands 

Current
 Wovenwar (2013–present)

Former
 Mothra (Gate City) (2003–2005)
 This Endearing (2005–2007)
 Year One (2010–2013)
 As I Lay Dying (2006–2014, 2018–2022)

Live
 Austrian Death Machine (2009–2014)
 Spiritbox (2022–present)

Session
 Pyrithion (2013)
 The End of an Age (2015)
 Light the Torch (2018)
 Ghost Atlas (2018)

Discography
As I Lay Dying
 An Ocean Between Us (2007)
 The Powerless Rise (2010)
 Decas (compilation, 2011)
 Awakened (2012)
 Shaped by Fire (2019)

Wovenwar
 Wovenwar (2014)
 Honor Is Dead (2016)

Session
 Pyrithion (2013) – Pyrithion
 Times Are Lost (2015) – The End of an Age
 Sleep Therapy: An Acoustic Performance (2018) – Ghost Atlas
 Revival (2018) – Light the Torch

Guest performances
 Total Brutal (2008) and Double Brutal (2009) – Austrian Death Machine
Eternal (2010) – War of Ages
 Mechanical Weather (2012) – A Tragedy in Progress
 "Afloat on Hope" (2013) – Heroes for Tonight

As producer
 Bad Wolves – Dear Monsters (2021)

References

External links
 Sparrow Sound
 Stateside Management profile
 
 

Christian metal musicians
Living people
American performers of Christian music
As I Lay Dying (band) members
Wovenwar members
1987 births
21st-century American bass guitarists